Hope Loring (29 January 1894 – 17 January 1959) was an English screenwriter. She wrote for 63 films between 1918 and 1931. She was born in England and died in Majorca, Spain.  She was married to fellow screenwriter and producer Louis D. Lighton.

Selected filmography

 The Lure of the Circus (1918)
 The Red Glove (1919)
 Wolf Tracks (1920)
 Masked (1920)
 Thieves' Clothes (1920)
 The Vanishing Dagger (1920)
 The Blue Fox (1921)
 Thorns and Orange Blossoms (1922)
 Paid Back (1922)
 Don't Marry for Money (1923)
 The Woman of Bronze (1923)
 East Side - West Side (1923)
 K – The Unknown (1924)
 The Lullaby (1924)
 Cornered (1924)
 Little Annie Rooney (1925)
 Ranger of the Big Pines (1925)
 Wandering Footsteps (1925)
 The Crown of Lies (1926)
 The Blind Goddess (1926)
 Fig Leaves (1926)
 It (1927)
 Children of Divorce (1927)
 Wings (1927)
 The Woman on Trial (1927)
 Get Your Man (1927)
 The Showdown (1928)
 The Four Feathers (1929)
 Paris (1929)
 This Is Heaven (1929)

References

External links

Hope Loring at the Women Film Pioneers Project

1894 births
1959 deaths
British women screenwriters
Women film pioneers
20th-century English screenwriters